The ASEAN Summit is a biannual meeting held by the members of the Association of Southeast Asian Nations (ASEAN) in relation to economic, political, security, and socio-cultural development of Southeast Asian countries. In addition, it serves as a prominent regional (Asia) and international (worldwide) conference, with world leaders attending its related summits and meetings to discuss various problems and global issues, strengthening co-operation, and making decisions. The summit has been praised by world leaders for its success and ability to produce results on a global level.

The league of ASEAN is currently connected with other countries who aim to participate on the missions and visions of the league. The league conducts annual meetings with other countries in an organisation collectively known as the ASEAN dialogue partners. ASEAN +3 adds China, Japan, and South Korea.

The formal summits are held in three days. The usual itinerary are as follows:

 ASEAN leaders hold an internal organisation meeting.
 ASEAN leaders hold a conference together with foreign ministers of the ASEAN Regional Forum.
 Leaders of three ASEAN Dialogue Partners (also known as ASEAN +3), namely China, Japan, and South Korea, hold a meeting with the ASEAN leaders.
 And a separate meeting is set for leaders of two ASEAN Dialogue Partners (also known as ASEAN +CER), namely Australia and New Zealand.

History 

The 1st ASEAN Summit was held in February 1976 in Bali, Indonesia. At this summit, ASEAN expressed its readiness to "develop fruitful relations" and mutually beneficial co-operation with other countries of the region. The ASEAN leaders signed the Treaty of Amity and Cooperation in Southeast Asia.
The 2nd ASEAN summit held in Kuala Lumpur, Malaysia in August 1977 was the occasion for the first summit meeting between Japan and ASEAN. Japan expressed its intention to promote co-operation with ASEAN.

At the 9th ASEAN Summit, a meeting in October 2003 in Bali, Indonesia, the leaders of the member states signed a declaration known as the Bali Concord II in which they agreed to pursue closer economic integration by 2020.

According to the declaration, "an ASEAN Community" would be set upon three pillars, "namely political and security cooperation, economic cooperation, and socio-cultural cooperation; For the purpose of ensuring durable peace, stability and shared prosperity in the region." The plan envisaged a region with a population of 500 million and annual trade of US$720 billion. Also, a free trade area would be established in the region by 2020. ASEAN's leaders also discussed setting up a security community alongside the economic one, though without any formal military alliance.

During the same meeting, China and ASEAN also agreed to work faster toward a mutual trade agreement which would create the world's most populous market, with 1.7 billion consumers. Japan also signed an agreement pledging to reduce tariff and non-tariff barriers with ASEAN members.

At the 11th ASEAN summit in December 2005 in Kuala Lumpur, Malaysia, several main issues were discussed:
 the spread of bird flu
 the South Thailand insurgency
 democracy in Myanmar
 crude oil prices fluctuation and poverty
 investment and trade
 ASEAN Charter

Immediately after the summit ended, the inaugural East Asia Summit was held.

The 12th ASEAN Summit was originally set to be hosted in Cebu in the Philippines in December 2006. However, on 8 December, organizers decided to move the summit schedule to January 2007 due to Typhoon Seniang hitting the area. Metro Cebu jointly hosted various events of the summit. The actual conference was held at the Cebu International Convention Centre in Mandaue, while the Shangri-La Mactan Island Resort & Spa in Lapu-Lapu City provided accommodations for delegates and venues for smaller meetings. At the summit, the member countries of ASEAN signed five agreements pertaining to continuing integration of ASEAN and enhancing political, economic, and social co-operation in the region:
 Cebu Declaration Towards a Caring and Sharing Community
 Cebu Declaration on the Blueprint for the ASEAN Charter
 Cebu Declaration on the Acceleration of the Establishment of an ASEAN Community by 2015
 ASEAN Declaration on the Protection and Promotion of the Rights of Migrant Workers
 ASEAN Convention on Counter Terrorism

The 13th ASEAN Summit was held in November 2007 in Singapore. The key theme of the discussions was set to be on "Energy, Environment, Climate Change and Sustainable Development". In line with the theme, the ASEAN Leaders' Declaration on Environmental Sustainability was signed at the summit and a proposal to work on a Singapore Declaration on the Environment was issued at the Third East Asia Summit. The leaders endorsed the ASEAN Economic Community Blueprint, which would help chart concrete targets for establishing a single market and production base in the ASEAN region by 2015. Other documents that were negotiated and signed include:
 ASEAN Mutual Recognition Agreement on Architectural Services
 ASEAN Framework Arrangement for the Mutual Recognition of Surveying Qualifications
 Protocol to Implement the Sixth Package of Commitments under the ASEAN Framework Agreement on Services
 Agreements on trade and areas of co-operation with ASEAN Dialogue Partners

The 15th ASEAN Summit was held in October 2009 in Hua Hin and Cha-am, Thailand. It involved the leaders of ASEAN member states together with their dialogue partners from China, Japan, South Korea, India, Australia, and New Zealand. A flurry of meetings among Asian leaders on the last day raised the possibility of forging a regional free trade pact, which is likely to be raised at the 2009 Asia Pacific Economic Cooperation summit.

The 28th and 29th ASEAN Summits were held in September 2016 in Vientiane, Laos. The year 2016 also marked the start off of the implementation of the ASEAN Community Vision 2025. Apart from the two main summits, other sideline summits under the umbrella of ASEAN were also held. There were nine Summits with ASEAN's Dialogue Partners under the ASEAN Plus One, ASEAN Plus Three, and East Asia Summit co-operation frameworks. Also, under the sub-regional co-operation framework, the Mekong-Japan Summit was held. This occasion also provided a platform for ASEAN Leaders to meet with Representatives of ASEAN Inter-Parliamentary Assembly (AIPA), Representatives of ASEAN Youth, and ASEAN Business Advisory Council. The main theme discussed at the summits was regarding the further commitment for the implementation of the ASEAN Community Vision 2025 and the three community Blueprints. ASEAN Leaders also signed the ASEAN Declaration on One ASEAN, One Response: ASEAN Responding to Disasters as One in the Region and Outside the Region.

South China Sea issues also came atop among important agenda at the summit. At the summit, the Philippines and Japan expressed serious concerns over China's maritime territorial claims and building of artificial islands in the South China Sea. Japan's Prime Minister, Shinzo Abe, called for peaceful settlement of dispute between China and the Philippines. The Philippines' President, Rodrigo Duterte, reaffirmed at the meeting that the dispute should be solved “within the boundaries of the law, referring to the arbitral ruling under the Philippines v. China case by the Permanent Court of Arbitration in July 2016. The draft statement of meetings included lukewarm criticism over China’s actions in the South China Sea. However, there were no statements about ASEAN’s position on the arbitral ruling. No multilateral statement has been clearly made to reflect the voice of the ASEAN community as a whole on the South China Sea issues. China reiterated that there should be no interference and the issues should be dealt in a bilateral manner.

ASEAN Summit
Under the ASEAN Charter, the ASEAN Summit is the supreme policy-making body of ASEAN. It comprises the heads of state or government of each member state. Accordingly, the Chairmanship of ASEAN rotates annually, based on the alphabetical order of the English names of ASEAN member states. The member state assuming the Chairmanship holds it for one calendar year, and chairs the ASEAN Summit and related summits, the ASEAN Coordinating Council, the three ASEAN Community Councils, relevant ASEAN Sectoral Ministerial Bodies and senior officials, and the Committee of Permanent Representatives. In addition, the Secretary General of the Association of Southeast Asian Nations is appointed by the ASEAN Summit, selected from among nationals of ASEAN member states based on alphabetical rotation. The Chairmanship of ASEAN for 2023 is held by Indonesia.

ASEAN Summit Meetings
The ASEAN Summit Meetings are held by its ten member states annually. Under the ASEAN Charter, ASEAN Summit Meetings are held twice annually, to be hosted by the member state holding the ASEAN Chairmanship. Further special or ad hoc meetings may be convened whenever necessary, to be chaired by the member state holding the ASEAN Chairmanship at venues to be agreed upon by the ASEAN member states.

During the fifth summit in Bangkok, the leaders decided to meet "informally" between each formal summit.

In 2020, during its year of chairmanship, Vietnam hosted a Special ASEAN summit and Special ASEAN+3 summit on COVID-19.

Issues

14th ASEAN Summit and Protest
The 14th ASEAN summit was held from February to March 2009 in Hua Hin, Thailand. It was originally scheduled for December 2008, but was postponed due to the 2008 Thai political crisis. At the summit, ASEAN leaders signed the Cha-am Hua Hin Declaration on the Roadmap for an ASEAN Community and adopted various other documents, including the ASEAN Political-Security Community Blueprint and the ASEAN Socio-Cultural Community Blueprint.
The summit was reconvened in Pattaya, Thailand in April 2009. This second part of the summit was to consist of various meetings between the ASEAN members and one or more non-ASEAN countries from 10 to 12 April. However, it was aborted on 11 April when hundreds of protesters forced their way past security forces into the venue. Many of the visiting leaders had to be evacuated from the venue by helicopter to a nearby military airbase, although none were injured. The protests were part of the 2008 Thai political crisis and were not believed to be directed at ASEAN leaders, but rather at Thailand's government.

East Timor

The new nation of East Timor, previously ruled by Indonesia, has had a long struggle with ASEAN. East Timor, during its long process towards independence, has sought to have observer status in ASEAN, much like Papua New Guinea, and eventually official member status. Historically, ASEAN countries supported Indonesia over East Timor, with the Philippines and Malaysia barring overseas NGOs from participating in East Timor conferences in the late 1990s. More recently, Myanmar opposed granting observer status to East Timor because of the latter's support for opposition leader Aung San Suu Kyi.

In 2002, East Timor was recognised as an observer of ASEAN and joined the ASEAN Regional Forum in 2005. In December 2005, the government of East Timor stated that the nation would be a member of ASEAN by 2011.

The nation's then-President, Xanana Gusmão, had already applied for membership at the 39th Annual Ministerial Meeting of ASEAN Foreign Ministers held in Kuala Lumpur in 2006. However, the request is still pending as of July 2019.

Myanmar (Burma)
Also prior to the 10th ASEAN Summit, Myanmar had taken steps to rehabilitate itself by releasing up to 9,000 prisoners who were imprisoned under the old junta. Myanmar's new leader General Soe Win attended the conference and foreign minister Nyan Win had already made pre-summit press releases on Myanmar's continuing commitment for the roadmap to democracy.

Myanmar was due to hold the chair of ASEAN in 2006. This however had attracted criticism from various factions. The United States and the European Union publicly announced that they might boycott any ASEAN-related event if Myanmar was the chair. In July 2005, during an ASEAN foreign minister meeting in Vientiane, Myanmar decided to postpone its turn. The Philippines, the country next in line, instead held the ASEAN chairmanship in 2006.

Apart from the United States, various ASEAN lawmakers have called Myanmar's membership to be stripped due to its poor human rights record.

Following the 2021 Myanmar coup d'état in which the Tatmadaw—Myanmar's military—ousted the country's democratically elected leaders, widespread protests broke out in response to the coup and the military's subsequent use of force on civilians. ASEAN called for a special ASEAN Leaders Meeting in Jakarta on April 24, 2021, with the military junta's leader Min Aung Hlaing in attendance along with other member states' heads of government and foreign ministers. Members of the National Unity Government formed in response to the coup and consisting of ousted lawmakers were reported to have been in contact with ASEAN leaders, but were not formally invited to the meeting. ASEAN released a statement that it had agreed to a "five-point consensus" with Min Aung Hlaing on the cessation of violence in Myanmar, constructive dialogue among all parties concerned, and the appointment of a special envoy by ASEAN to facilitate the dialogue process. However, after continued violence in the country and non-committal by Myanmar's military government to the "five-point consensus", its military leaders were barred from attending the 40th and 41st ASEAN Summits in November 2022.

Thailand

Prior to the 10th ASEAN summit, Thai Prime Minister Thaksin Shinawatra publicly threatened to walk out of the meeting if any member states raised the issue of the Thai government's handling of the insurgency in south Thailand. He stated "If the topic is raised, I will fly back home". This is notable since leaders have often shown solidarity with each other over high-profile issues such as East Timor and the handling by Myanmar of Aung San Suu Kyi. Furthermore, one of the principles on which ASEAN was founded is a stated principle of non-interference in the internal affairs of other member states, as enshrined in the Treaty of Amity and Cooperation in Southeast Asia. Any tension has been kept from the public view and leaders have avoided confrontational statements in public.

Indonesia (the world's most populous Muslim country) and Malaysia, however, were particularly vehement in their condemnation over the Thai government's handling of the events in south Thailand, with a former Malaysian Prime minister going to the extent of suggesting that the Southern Thai states should be given autonomy power. The Malaysian foreign minister further was quoted as saying that there is no such thing as absolute non-interference. It is thought that Thaksin's statement was made following the Malaysian government's passing of an opposition resolution condemning the Thai government for the death of at least 85 Muslim protestors in southern Thailand.

Laotian spokesman Yong Chanthalangsy stated "I think we have a golden rule, that is non-interference in the internal affairs of each other." He added "It is a courtesy among the leaders, among the ministers, that if one of the leaders does not wish to discuss a question, all the leaders will respect it."

Free Trade Area
In 2004, Australia and New Zealand started the negotiation for a free trade deal with ASEAN. The ASEAN-Australia-New Zealand Free Trade Area was established at the 14th ASEAN Summit in 2009. It is one of Asia's largest trade arrangements and covers trade in goods, investment and services, financial services, telecommunications, electronic commerce, and intellectual property. The aim of the negotiation is to significantly reduce trade barriers by 2016.

Treaty of Amity and Cooperation
ASEAN's Treaty of Amity and Cooperation in Southeast Asia is open for non-ASEAN states to accede. It requires the contracting parties to forgo any threat or use of force against each other.

The foreign ministers of ASEAN member states determined that invitation to the inaugural East Asia Summit, the first of which was held in late 2005 and hosted by Malaysia, was to be restricted to parties to the treaty. The Howard Government in Australia, although seeking invitation, was reluctant to accede to the treaty, claiming that it was out of date and might conflict with obligations and rights it had under other treaties. However, with entry to the summit confined to parties to the treaty, and with domestic pressure to sign, Australia decided in early 2005 to sign the treaty on the condition that its rights under the Charter of the United Nations are recognised as inalienable. Upon the announcement of accession, Australian Foreign Minister Alexander Downer was asked whether or not he considered himself an east Asian, he replied: "Do I consider myself an East Asian? ... I consider myself an Australian."

References

External links 
 Official and special interest
 ASEAN official website
 ASEAN Summit 2021 official website
 12th Summit Special News website
 12th ASEAN Summit Special Coverage website
 Special Coverage website

 
20th-century diplomatic conferences
21st-century diplomatic conferences (Asia-Pacific)